Baron Luigi Parrilli was an Italian aristocrat a native of Genoa, who took part in the negotiations between SS leaders and the CIA's future director, Allen Dulles, during Operation Sunrise.

References

Nobility from Genoa
Italian fascists
Italian people of World War II